Bussière-Galant is a railway station in Bussière-Galant, Nouvelle-Aquitaine, France. The station is located on the Limoges-Bénédictins - Périgueux railway line. The station is served by TER (local) services operated by SNCF.

Train services
The following services currently call at Bussière-Galant:
local service (TER Nouvelle-Aquitaine) Limoges - Thiviers - Périgueux - Bordeaux

References

Railway stations in Haute-Vienne